Corneel "Neel" Seys (12 February 1912 – 10 January 1944) was a Belgian footballer. He was born in Antwerp.

He was a defender for Beerschot VAC from 1930 to 1943. With the Antwerp team, he twice won the Belgian First Division, in 1938 and 1939.

He played twice for the Diables Rouges, including one match at the 1938 World Cup.

Honours 
 International in 1938 (2 caps)
 Participation in the 1938 World Cup (played 1 match)
 Champion of Belgium in 1938 and 1939 with Beerschot VAC

References

External links
 

Belgium international footballers
Belgian footballers
1938 FIFA World Cup players
K. Beerschot V.A.C. players
1912 births
Footballers from Antwerp
1944 deaths
Association football defenders